Thomas Grendelmeier (born c. 1961) is a former Swiss curler.

At the time of the 1987 World championship, he was employed as a mechanical engineer.

Teams

References

External links
 

Living people
1960s births
Swiss male curlers
European curling champions
Swiss curling champions
Swiss mechanical engineers